The 2020 Carlton Football Club season was the Carlton Football Club's 157th season of competition. The season was disrupted and partially curtailed by the COVID-19 pandemic.

It was the club's men's team's 124th season as a member of the Australian Football League. The team finished 11th out of eighteen teams with a 7–10 record in the 2020 AFL season.

It was the club's women's team's fourth season as a member of the AFL Women's competition. The team reached the preliminary finals of the 2020 AFL Women's season, before the onset of the pandemic saw the season cancelled without the premiership being awarded.

Club summary
The 2020 AFL season was the 124th season of the VFL/AFL competition since its inception in 1897; and, having competed in every season, it was also the 124rd season contested by the Carlton Football Club. Contractually, Carlton's primary home ground continued to be the Melbourne Cricket Ground, with many games also to have been played at Marvel Stadium, and traditional home ground Ikon Park continued to serve as the training and administrative base; however, due to the coronavirus pandemic forcing games to be moved out of Victoria, the club hosted games at Metricon Stadium and the Gabba in Queensland and Optus Stadium in Perth, hosted no games at the Melbourne Cricket Ground, and used the Mercure Gold Coast as a training base for much of the season.

The club fielded its women's team in the fourth season of the AFL Women's competition, running in February and March, and Ikon Park served as the home ground for AFL Women's matches. Carlton continued its alignment with the Northern Blues in the Victorian Football League through the pre-season; but terminated the alignment on 26 March as a cost-saving measure during the coronavirus pandemic; as with all AFL clubs, Carlton had no reserves team or affiliation during the season, and reserves players were restricted to playing scratch matches against other AFL clubs. The VFL Women's season was cancelled due to the pandemic, so the club's VFL Women's team did not compete.

Car manufacturer Hyundai, which had been a major sponsor of the club continuously since 2008, and airline Virgin Australia, which had upgraded from a secondary sponsor to a major sponsor during the 2017 season, continued as the club's two major sponsors, under deals in place until 2022; the latter sponsorship remained in place, despite the airline going into administration during the coronavirus pandemic. The club's long term on- and off-field apparel deal with Nike, which had been in place since 1998, came to an end in October 2019, and the club signed a new 10-year apparel deal with PUMA.

The club again achieved a record membership in 2020, finishing with 67,035 members for the year. The club passed the full-year 2019 record in early March, before the season had even begun – as well as before the curtailment of the season was announced. This was the club's third consecutive huge increase in membership numbers, having increased from 50,130 to a then-record 56,005 members in 2018, then to another record of 64,269 in 2019.

Impact of COVID-19 pandemic
The 2020 season was disrupted by the COVID-19 pandemic, which was formally declared a pandemic on 11 March 2020, eight days prior to the scheduled start of the men's premiership season and prior to Round 6 of the women's season.

Carlton's season endured the following disruptions and special arrangements:
The men's season was suspended after Round 1, and was shortened from the originally scheduled 22 matches to 17 matches. The season did not restart until 11 June.
 The team was forced to temporarily relocate away from Victoria after Round 5, due to interstate travel restrictions placed on Victorians during the state's second wave of the virus in July. The club set up a base at the Mercure Gold Coast hub in south-east Queensland starting from Round 6, and travelled to Perth for a one-month hub from Round 9 to 12.
 The women's home-and-away season was shortened from eight matches to six. Three weeks of finals were to follow, but only one was played before the season was cancelled.
 Matches in Victoria were played in empty stadiums, and those played interstate in front of restricted-sized crowds, in response to government-imposed restrictions imposed on public gatherings.
 The start of the 2020 VFL season was delayed, before AFL-listed players were excluded from competing in state league competitions altogether, to keep players in the fully professional environment for tighter medical and quarantine controls. As a result, Carlton reserves players were restricted only to training, or playing scratch matches against other AFL clubs.

Carlton, along with all AFL clubs, were forced to find significant cost savings to cover the loss of revenue, which in Carlton's case included gate and broadcast revenue from closed and cancelled games, as well as gaming revenue as a result of non-essential venue closures across the country; the club also suffered financially as a result of joint major sponsor Virgin Australia being placed into administration, itself severely affected by travel restrictions imposed during the pandemic, although the club's partnership with Virgin continued.

Among the cost saving decisions, Carlton ended its 18-year association with its , the Northern Blues, in late March; the club had been investing significant money in building up the club as a development ground for its reserves and a senior development pathway for the northern suburbs; but with money tight, opted to end the affiliation and adopt a lower-cost strategy of re-establishing a stand-alone reserves team, which would contest the VFL at the next opportunity. The Northern Blues club, which was heavily dependent on Carlton's financial support to remain viable as an entity, initially announced that it would be wound up as a result, and it was not included in the ultimately cancelled plans for a shortened 2020 VFL season; but, the club regrouped and will remain in the VFL under as a stand-alone senior Northern Bullants from 2021. As with all other AFL clubs, most of the club's workforce was stood down during the height of the pandemic.

During July, while based interstate, the club was fined $45,000 for an inadvertent breach of COVID-19 protocols when one member of the travelling party sought childcare services outside the league's quarantine bubble.

Senior Personnel
Mark LoGiudice continued as club president, a role he has held since June 2014.

David Teague entered his first full season as the appointed senior coach of the club, having served as caretaker during the second half of 2019 after Brendon Bolton was sacked. Teague was appointed senior coach on a three-year contract with two rounds remaining in the 2019 season. To the coaching panel over the preseason were added:  assistant coach Henry Playfair, who became head of coaching performance; AFL Academy manager Luke Power, who became head of development; and Geelong Falcons coach Daniel O'Keefe in a development coaching role. Power replaced Shane Watson, who departed after four years with the club. Following the trade and draft periods, general manager of List Management and Strategy Stephen Silvagni departed the club after five years in the role. The financial pressure of the coronavirus pandemic, as well as the termination of the affiliation with the Northern Blues, resulted in Northern coach Josh Fraser being terminated.

Patrick Cripps and Sam Docherty continued in their roles as joint captains for the second consecutive season – with Docherty playing his first games as captain after having missed the 2019 season (as well as the 2018 season) due to injury. Liam Jones, Jacob Weitering and Sam Walsh were added to the club's expanded seven-man leadership group, with Ed Curnow and Marc Murphy holding their places. Veteran Kade Simpson stepped aside from the group.

Statistics are correct as of end of 2019 season.
Flags represent the state of origin, i.e. the state in which the player played his Under-18s football.

For players: (c) denotes captain, (vc) denotes vice-captain, (dvc) denotes deputy vice-captain, (lg) denotes leadership group.
For coaches: (s) denotes senior coach, (cs) denotes caretaker senior coach, (a) denotes assistant coach, (d) denotes development coach, (m) denotes managerial or administrative role in a football or coaching department

Playing list changes
The following summarises all player changes which occurred after the 2019 season. Unless otherwise noted, draft picks refer to selections in the 2019 National Draft.

In

Out

List management

Season summary

Pre-season
The club played three full-length practice matches in the lead-up to the season and prior to the announcement of the season's curtailment. The matches against Fremantle and Brisbane were scheduled as part of the Marsh Community Series, and the match against Collingwood was arranged between the clubs in late January with the gold coin entry donation fee serving as a fundraiser for the 2019–20 Australian bushfire relief effort.

Home and away season
Owing to the curtailment of the AFL season and uncertainty in the fixture, portions of the fixture were gradually released during the year, and sometimes changed at short notice. The only such change which affected Carlton was in Round 5: on the Monday prior to the game, Carlton's Saturday game against  was rescheduled to Thursday night, to fill the television timeslot left by a cancelled  vs  match; the venue was changed from the Melbourne Cricket Ground to Marvel Stadium.

Carlton had its best home-and-away season for seven years, carrying on from a successful second half to 2019. Carlton maintained consistent performance through the majority of the season, and had a 4–4 record through the first eight rounds, with many games decided by close margins. From Rounds 9 to 12, Carlton went into a hub in Perth, where it lost its first two matches against  and  after holding strong leads to fall to 4–6; but, a narrow victory against  to end the hub period and a comfortable win against  the following week brought the club back to 6–6, and still in a position to challenge for finals.

A mathematical chance of finals remained until the Round 17 loss against wooden spooners , and a 1–4 end to the season saw the club finish 11th, with a record of 7–10.

Across the entire season, Carlton's results were mostly in line with finishing position. The team was consistently competitive, and its heaviest defeat for the season was only 31 points – the lowest of any team in the league for the year.

In spite of this, it was a year of wild results and momentum swings. Twice, Carlton conceded the first seven goals yet fought back – for a 1-point loss against  in Round 2, and a 5-point win against  in Round 16. Twice, Carlton also blew huge leads: against  in Round 3, Carlton led by 42 points before almost being overrun, winning by only two points; and against  in Round 9, Carlton kicked the first five goals to lead by 31 points, before losing by the same amount.

Team awards and records
Game records and awards
Several marks in low scoring were set across the AFL during the season, in large part due to matches being played with 16 minute quarters instead of 20 minute quarters.
Round 4 – Carlton's score of 7.10 (52) against Essendon was its lowest winning score since Round 12, 1989.
Round 4 – the club won the Madden Cup as winners of its rivalry game against Essendon.
Round 12 – Carlton's score of 5.10 (40) in wet conditions against Fremantle was its lowest winning score since Round 12, 1977.
Round 12 - Fremantle's score of 5.6 (36) was Carlton's lowest score conceded since Round 22, 2001.
Round 12 – The aggregate score of 76 points in the match against Fremantle was the lowest in any Carlton game since Round 11, 1991.
Round 13 - Gold Coast's score of 4.3 (27) was, for the second consecutive week, Carlton's lowest score conceded since Round 22, 2001.
Round 13 – Gold Coast's seven scoring shots was the fewest conceded by Carlton in a game since Round 13, 1987.
Rounds 12–13 – The combined 63 points scored by Fremantle and Gold Coast was the fewest total points conceded in consecutive games by Carlton since Rounds 4–5, 1919.
Round 15 – GWS' score of 6.12 (48) was the lowest score against which Carlton had lost a game since Round 15, 1965.

Game events
Round 7 – Carlton lost by three points against Port Adelaide after Robbie Gray (Port Adelaide) kicked a goal after the final siren, from a 45m set shot near the boundary line. It was the first time Carlton had lost on an after-the-siren kick since Round 10, 2002.
Round 12 – Carlton won by four points against Fremantle after Jack Newnes kicked a goal after the final siren, from a 45m set shot outside the boundary line. It was the first time Carlton had won on an after-the-siren kick since Round 22, 1987.

Season records
The club's win–loss record of 7–10, finishing position of 11th, and percentage of 94.3 were all the best the club had achieved since 2013.
The club's heaviest defeat of the year of 31 points was its narrowest heaviest defeat since 1988.

Individual awards and records

John Nicholls Medal
The Carlton Football Club Best and Fairest awards night took place on 19 February 2021, the club opting to defer the ceremony until well into 2021 in the hope of staging it free in the usual manner and free from the tight COVID-19 restrictions present during the month after the season. The John Nicholls Medal, for the best and fairest player of the club, as well as several other awards, were presented on the night.

John Nicholls Medal
The winner of the John Nicholls Medal was Jacob Weitering, who polled 137 votes to win the award for the first time in his career. Sam Walsh finished second in just his second season with the club, polling 126 votes; and Ed Curnow finished third with 103 votes to become the first player since Chris Judd (2010–2012) to finish in the top three in three consecutive seasons.

Other awards
The following other awards were presented on John Nicholls Medal night:-
Best Young Player – Tom de Koning
Best Clubman – Nic Newman
Spirit of Carlton Award – Marc Pittonet
Bill Lanyon Inner Blue Ruthless Award – Jacob Weitering
Carltonians William A. Cook Award – Sam Walsh
Coaches' Award – Jack Martin
Most Valuable Bluebagger Award – Liam Jones

The 'Best Young Player' award replaced the long-standing 'Best First Year Player' award, with less stringent qualification criteria.

Leading goalkickers 
Harry McKay was Carlton's leading goalkicker for the season, kicking 21 goals. It was McKay's second consecutive season as leading goalkicker – the first time a player had achieved back-to-back leading goalkicker titles for the club since Brendan Fevola in 2008 and 2009. In the shortened season, it was the fewest goals to win the title since Ian Nankervis in 1964.

Other awards
AFL Coaches' Association awards
Sam Walsh won the AFL Coaches' Association Best Young Player award for the two-year period of 2019–2020, polling 64 votes to win comfortably ahead of Connor Rozee who polled 33 votes.

Honorific teams
All-Australian team – one Carlton player, Jacob Weitering, was nominated in the 40-man squad for the 2020 All Australian team. He was not selected in the final team of 22.
22under22 team – two Carlton players –  Sam Walsh and Jacob Weitering – were named in the 22under22 team for the 2020 season. It was Weitering's third time selected in the team, and he was named vice-captain; and it was Walsh's second selection. Harry McKay was also nominated in the original 40-man squad. The final 22-man team will be announced on 22 September.

Mark of the Year
Sam Walsh was the winner of the AFL Mark of the Year award, for a courageous overhead mark taken running back with the flight of the ball into a pack of four players in the Round 7 match against . Walsh was Carlton's first Mark of the Year winner since 1999.

Goal of the Year
Two Carlton players were among the final three nominees for Goal of the Year:
Jack Newnes, for the 50m after the siren set shot from the boundary line which secured Carlton's Round 12 victory against .
Patrick Cripps, for his goal in Round 17 against , in which he had three attempts at a clearance from a centre wing stoppage before gathering, cradling the ball behind his back to spin out of trouble, dodged another player with a one-two to Eddie Betts, baulked another player then kicked a goal on the run from 50m.
Both players were defeated by Josh Daicos for the award.

Club records
Round 4 – Kade Simpson played his 329th senior game for the club, surpassing John Nicholls to become the player with the third-most games in the history of the club.
Round 7 – Eddie Betts kicked his 300th goal for Carlton, becoming the 13th player to reach the milestone.
Representative honours
The following Carlton players were selected for representative teams during the 2020 season.
In the State of Origin for Bushfire Relief Match for the All-Stars:  Eddie Betts and Patrick Cripps.

Women's teams

AFL Women's
Squad
Daniel Harford retained his position as senior coach of the team.

The club's 2020 squad is given below. The number of games played and goals scored in the 2020 season is given in parentheses.

Season
Carlton was placed in Conference B for the 2020 season. When the home-and-away season was cancelled after six rounds, Carlton finished second in the conference with a record of 5–1.

Finals
Finishing second in Conference B after the curtailed home-and-away season, Carlton qualified for the semi-finals, hosting , who had finished third in Conference A. Carlton had a comfortable win against Brisbane in the semi-final, gaining the lead in the second quarter and extending its advantage in each quarter thereafter before winning by 29 points.

This was to set up a preliminary final match against first placed Conference A team , but the season was cancelled before this match could be played.

Notable events
Richmond's home game against Carlton was shifted from Richmond's home ground, the Swinburne Centre, to Ikon Park because the crowd was anticipated to exceed Swinburne Centre's capacity.

League Awards
The following individual awards and honours were won by Carlton players:
Madison Prespakis won the league best and fairest, polling 15 out of a possible 18 votes to win by a margin of three from 's Kiara Bowers.
Madison Prespakis, Tayla Harris and Kerryn Harrington were all named in the 2020 AFL Women's All-Australian team. Georgia Gee was also nominated in the 40-woman squad.
Madison Prespakis, Georgia Gee and Charlotte Wilson were all named in the women's 22under22 team, with Prespakis named vice captain.

Club Awards
Madison Prespakis won the club's best and fairest award for the second consecutive season, after having shared the award with Brianna Davey in 2019. Prespakis polled 74 votes to win the award ahead of Chloe Dalton (56 votes) and Georgia Gee (43 votes).
Georgia Gee won the club's Rising Star award as the most improved player.
Grace Egan won the Best First Year Player award.
Jess Edwards won the Carlton Way Blue Bloods award as best club woman.

VFL Women's
Carlton's VFL Women's team was set to contest the VFL Women's competition for the third time; however, the season was cancelled due to the coronavirus pandemic.

References

Carlton Football Club seasons
Carlton
Carlton